Guillermo Herbert Pérez (born 10 February 1934) is a Mexican politician affiliated with the National Action Party. As of 2014 he served as Senator of the LVIII and LIX Legislatures of the Mexican Congress representing Querétaro.

References

1934 births
Living people
People from Querétaro City
Members of the Senate of the Republic (Mexico)
National Action Party (Mexico) politicians
21st-century Mexican politicians